Kazimierz Fabisiak (11 February 1903, Warsaw – 28 April 1971, Kraków) was a Polish actor, director, theatre, and theatre director.

Partial filmography

 Nikodem Dyzma (1956) - Leon Kunicki
 Czlowiek na torze (1957) - Konarski
 Zimowy zmierzch (1957)
 Ziemia (1957) - Priest
 Pozegnanie z diablem (1957) - Glocerek, lawyer
 Skarb kapitana Martensa (1957) - Dominik
 Deszczowy lipiec (1958) - Holiday-Maker
 Historia jednego mysliwca (1958) - Francois, photographer
 Pozegnania (1958) - Man at the Bar
 Noc poslubna (1959) - Hanka's Father
 Miejsce na ziemi (1960) - Edmund
 Historia wspólczesna (1961) - Dispatcher Jagoda
 Mother Joan of the Angels (1961) - Father Brym
 Milczące ślady (1961) - Pharmacist Stanislaw Walczak
 Dwaj panowie 'N''' (1962) - Waclaw Kaczmarek
 Drugi brzeg (1962) - straznik wiezienny Gadek
 Glos z tamtego swiata (1962) - Foreman (uncredited)
 Pamietnik pani Hanki (1963) - Dziedzic
 Milczenie (1963) - Proboszcz
 Mój drugi ozenek (1964) - Franek
 Echo (1964)
 Panienka z okienka (1964) - Johannes Szulc
 Goraca linia (1965) - Larysz
 Potem nastąpi cisza (1965) - Zosia's Father
 Pieklo i niebo (1966) - Old Devil
 Sciana czarownic (1967) - Wierszycki
 Jak rozpetalem druga wojne swiatowa (1970) - Father Dominik
 Album polski (1970) - Archaeology Professor
 Pierscien ksieznej Anny (1971) - ksiadz Kaleb
 Slonce wschodzi raz na dzien'' (1972) - Priest Paterek (uncredited)

External links
 

1903 births
1971 deaths
Burials at Rakowicki Cemetery
Male actors from Warsaw